CC-HOD (Catalytic Carbon - Hydrogen On Demand) is a process which splits water into hydrogen and oxygen at low temperatures.

History 
The CC-HOD method was discovered by Howard Phillips, managing director of Phillips Company, a pharmaceutical manufacturing company.

Hydrogen is energy dense and environmentally benign because upon combustion it produces only water vapor. Most hydrogen fuel is produced by electrolysis, a process that requires substantial energy. Phillips proposed that CC-HOD could become an alternative to electrolysis.

Process 

CC-HOD requires catalytic carbon, scrap metal, and water heated only modestly above ambient temperature. Aluminium is submerged in a tank with the catalytic carbon. Oxygen remains in the tank, where it bonds with the aluminium to form aluminium hydroxide:

Al + H²O + CC = CC + Al(OH)³ + H²

Research 

CC-HOD has mainly been researched by open science projects. LENR Ltd. is a UK based open research group specializing in validating novel energy technologies. They tested CC-HOD for several years and claimed it was reliable.

Potential applications 

Besides production of clean energy for transportation and heating, CC-HOD can be used for recycling scrap metal. Depending on which type of metal is used, the byproducts from the process could be used to manufacture electronics, deodorant, paint, or ink.

Patent 

A US patent application titled 'Methods and systems for producing hydrogen' was filed June 24, 2012.

References

Hydrogen production